Mike Pilavachi, MBE (born 7 March 1958) is a British charismatic Christian evangelist and author of Greek Cypriot descent. He is the co-founder and leader of the Soul Survivor charity based in Watford, England.

Christian Ministry

Pilavachi one of three senior pastors of the Soul Survivor Watford church, based in North Watford, which he set up in 1993 along with worship leader Matt Redman. A former accountant, he became a youth worker at St Andrew's C of E church in Chorleywood, Hertfordshire. It was here that two ministers at St Andrew's, David Pytches and Barry Kissell launched the New Wine Christian Family Conferences. Pilavachi has written several books on Christianity including Soul Survivor (with Nicky Gumbel, 2004), Live the Life (with Craig Borlaise, 2001), Storylines: Tracing the Threads of the Bible and most recently, “Everyday Supernatural: Living A Spirit-Led Life Without Being Weird”, which he co-authored with friend and colleague Andy Croft.

Pilavachi is celibate and encourages celibacy to those outside of marriage. He has stated in interviews and seminars that the "gift of celibacy" enables him to do certain work which he would not be able to with a family.

Pilavachi helped run the international evangelistic event, Soul in the City, London in 2004 and Soul in the City Durban in 2009. He was also one of the founders of the Hope 08 project, an initiative of the churches of Britain and Ireland which sought to demonstrate Christian faith in action. He was made a deacon in the Church of England at St Albans Abbey on 1 July 2012, and ordained a priest the following year. He was made an honorary canon of St Albans Cathedral in 2016.

Soul Survivor

Pilavachi launched Soul Survivor in the summer of 1993. The event is a 5-day long charismatic Christian festival aimed at youth and the initial Soul Survivor attracted 1,896 delegates. Under the guidance of Pilavachi, the event has grown to accommodate around 30,000 people over four weeks along with the fifth week, being Momentum (aimed at those in their twenties and thirties). Matt Redman, who had attended Pilavachi's youth club at St Andrews Church of England Chorleywood, was a worship leader at early Soul Survivor camps. Matt Redman returned as a worship leader in 2011. From  summer 2014 a fifth week of Soul Survivor is held in Scotland.

In May 2018, Pilavachi announced that the Soul Survivor conference would be ending after the summer events of 2019.

Personal life 

On 28 December 2019, it was announced in the new years honours list that Pilavachi would be receiving an MBE for services to young people.

See also
 Soul Survivor (charity)

References

External links
 Soul Survivor UK Website
 Storylines Mike Pilavachi
 Pilavachi talking to Jesus Army about his life

1958 births
Living people
British people of Greek Cypriot descent
British Pentecostals
Members of the Order of the British Empire
People from Chorleywood
Alumni of St Mellitus College
Church of England priests